Anton Alekseyevich Bakov (born 29 December 1965) is a Russian businessman, monarchist politician, traveler, writer and human rights activist. He is the chairman of the Russian Monarchist Party, was a member of the 4th convocation of the State Duma of Russia from 2003 to 2007 and was a candidate at 2018 Russian presidential election. Due to being known for a long series of unusual political projects such as Ural franc, the writer Alexei Ivanov coined him a "political Leonardo".

Bakov claims to have restored the Russian Empire through his establishment of the micronation of the Imperial Throne in 2011. In 2014, the Imperial Throne issued a manifesto announcing that royal Romanov family heir, German Prince Karl Emich of Leiningen had succeeded Nicholas II and is now Emperor Nicholas III. In 2017, the micronation was re-branded into Romanov Empire, and it was announced the African nation of The Gambia had begun the process of its state recognition. Under this regime, Bakov holds the position of Archchancellor and bears the title of "His Serene Highness Prince" (Knyaz).

Biography

Bakov was born on 29 December 1965 in Sverdlovsk, (now Yekaterinburg) in a family of engineers who worked at the Uralmash machine building plant. He tells there are seven generations of Russian Orthodox priests in his ancestry.

He graduated from the Ural Polytechnic Institute (now the Ural State Technical University) in 1988. He was a Lenin grant-aided student and graduated with honours. While a student he became an activist in the anti-communist movement. He organized several political activities including the public boycott of uncontested elections to the Supreme Soviet of the Soviet Union in 1984, the founding of a public movement aimed at re-opening churches closed down by the communists and the saving of the memorials of national history in Verkhoturye in 1987. In 1988, he also initiated the removal of the plates with the names of Joseph Stalin's NKVD executioners from city streets. Since 1989, he hired and later supervised for about 10 years political activities of his close university-time friend Alexander Burkov, who later became a prominent politician and in 2018 became the governor of Omsk Oblast.

Bakov is married and has four children and six grandchildren. His daughter Anastasia, who is an actress and singer residing in Moscow, was a candidate for mayoral elections in Yekaterinburg in 2013. His son Mikhail was a candidate for Yekaterinburg City Duma the same year, and the son Ilya attempted to run for Moscow mayor at 2018 Moscow mayoral election.

1980s–90s
Bakov is one of the first legal businessmen in Russia. In 1987, four months after the permission to set up first independent cooperative societies in the Soviet Union and while still at university, Bakov established the private tourist agency "Cedar", the first such agency in the country. In 1991 on the basis of this agency, he established the company "East Line" which involved in air cargo transfers between Europe and Asia and became the operating agent for Moscow Domodedovo Airport. Bakov invited Dmitry Kamenshchik to co-operate the company, and they managed the airport to receive international status in 1992. Bakov left the business in 1994, the airport grew up to become Russia's largest since then.

In 1994, Anton Bakov was elected a Serov county deputy of Sverdlovsk Oblast Parliament — Sverdlovsk Oblast Duma and the Chairman of the Duma Legislative Committee. His first actions as a deputy were aimed against the federal appointments of city mayors and regional governors. He and his like-minded team succeeded in holding the executive government elections in 1995–1996. At the same time Bakov created and supported the so-called Social Ambulance – a system of social control. In 1994 he became an active member of Duma's Chairman Eduard Rossel's team. He was a member of the pre-election committee for E. Rossel in 1995, who won the election.

Bakov participated in the Yekaterinburg mayor elections in 1995, and came second behind Arkady Chernetsky. In 1996 he was elected the vice-chairman of Sverdlovsk Regional Duma, and then was nominated for the post of the Governor of Kurgan region, but his candidature was not registered. In 1997–2000 Bakov became the General Director (CEO) of the city-forming enterprise —  (9,000 employees). This experience became very important for his future career.

Anton Bakov is the author of the project of Ural franc—a scrip printed in 1991 for usage in early post-Soviet economical regional projects. It never was used in this way; but in 1997–2000 the banknotes were used as money substitute at Serov Metallurgical Plant to help to overcome the 1998 Russian financial crisis. Nowadays they have numismatic value and are exhibited at museums.

Bakov is also one of the creators of law base for the Ural Republic—a 1993 project to transform Sverdlovsk Oblast into republic which involved top Oblast officials and was stopped shortly after creation. As a chairman of Oblast Duma Law Committee, Bakov was working on Charter of the Oblast since 1992, in 1993 it was presented as a Constitution of the Ural Republic, and in 1994 the base of that text became the official Oblast Charter with recommendations to use it in other regions. Ural Republic is unrelated to Ural franc, as some suppose, because the Republic did not plan to establish its own currency. However, Bakov authored the Flag of the Republic.

2000s
In 2000 Anton Bakov was elected to the House of Representatives (the upper chamber) of the Legislative Assembly of Sverdlovsk Oblast (from Serov single-mandate electoral district). He fought against corruption (organized "Anti-Mafia" public movement, which opposed the criminal organization "Uralmash gang") and against the propriety redistribution process. In order to increase the wellbeing of the population, Bakov was involved in educational activities, created consumer and credit cooperatives, councils of local public self-governing bodies and condominiums. As an MP, Bakov proposed to increase the size of the allowances for children and the introduction of regional additional payments to state pensions. Since 2002 Bakov has been engaged in buying land, and now is one of the largest landowners of the Urals. As a developer, Bakov actively started building country houses for sale. In addition, he is actively involved in political consulting. In recent years he specialized in the development of Internet, media and political social networks, including those which are aimed at mobilizing people to fight corruption.

In 2002 there was a scandal at 2002 Winter Olympics where Russian figure skater Irina Slutskaya was denied 1st place despite widespread professional opinions that she would win; particularly, Figure Skating Federation of Russia demanded a second gold medal for her. Anton Bakov at the time had ordered a custom copy of olympic gold medal completely made of gold (700 grams, while the genuine one contained only 6 grams) and personally awarded it to Slutskaya.

In 2003, Bakov participated in the elections of the Governor of Sverdlovsk region. He accused Eduard Rossel of having links with the criminal organization "Uralmash gang". In the second round Anton Bakov lost, gaining 330,000 votes against the more than 600,000 obtained by Eduard Rossel. In 2003 he was elected to the State Duma from single-mandate Serovskiy electoral district No. 167.

After the election, he joined the party "the Union of Right Forces". He supervised all the successful election campaigns of the party in all the regions, except for Chechnya, in 2004–2007. In December 2006, Bakov was elected the Secretary of the electoral work of the "Union of Right Forces". He is considered to be the one who proposed abandoning traditional right-wing party liberal rhetoric and populist slogans such as raising pensions and supporting the poor. Because of the defeat of the Union of Right Forces in the 2007 Russian legislative election and the abolition of single-mandate electoral districts, Anton Bakov did not get into the State Duma for the next term.

2010s
In 2010s Bakov concentrated on making business and authoring of books dedicated to politics and society (see below). Nevertheless, he is episodically involved in political actions, sometimes involving his children (see above). In 2017 he attempted to run for President of Russia at 2018 Russian presidential election (see below).

Current projects

Russian Monarchist Party

Bakov's modern political project, established in 2012, is the Russian Monarchist Party which supports return of monarchy in Russia, ousted in 1917. In 2013 it was declared that German Prince Karl Emich of Leiningen, a direct royal Romanov family descendant, is now viewed as the primary heir to the Russian Throne upon his conversion from Lutheranism to Eastern Orthodox Christianity in Nuremberg on 1 June 2013. Monarchist Party participated in mayoral elections in Yekaterinburg on 8 September 2013. The candidate for mayor was Bakov's 22-year-old daughter Anastassia, a singer and actress living in Moscow who recently graduated from Boris Shchukin Theatre Institute. She campaigned using references to the city authorities' performance and to God (who is the keeper of monarchy and protector of the people). Also there, 57 students ran as the party's candidates for elections for City Duma.

In 2015 Bakov announced the Party's plans to run for the upcoming 2016 Russian State Duma elections. In early 2016 in an interview with RBK news agency, he confirmed this intention and stated that Anastasia would again become the front person of the planned campaign, and he personally would not run. However, the party did not end up participating.

In early 2016 Bakov had announced the Monarchist Party plans to organize a public trial for Lenin and Stalin, accusing them of killing millions of Russians and thus significantly slowing down the normal evolution of society and state.

2018 presidential campaign
In fall 2017 Bakov started campaigning for the 2018 Russian presidential election, being nominated by the Monarchist Party. Creation of a "Monarchist Internationale" was the part of Bakov's electoral programme for the elections. Bakov withdrew his candidature on January 24, 2018, declaring that his second Romanov Empire citizenship officially prevents him from the run.

Nicholas III and The Romanov Empire

In early 2014 Bakov announced he views the Russian Throne (See) from the point of international law as a subject of state sovereignty regardless of any other attributes, referring to analogues with the Holy See. He outlined that Karl Emich, after accepting Orthodox religion, got a right to take this See according to pre-Revolution Fundamental Laws of the Russian Empire. Bakov proposed the prince to accept the throne to form a new independent state and incorporate it into Bakov's promotional projects such as Monarchist Party, revival of the Russian Empire and several others. In April 2014 Bakov and Karl Emich appeared in a newspaper textual and photo report declaring the prince accepted the proposals as well as the title of "Emperor Nicholas III" (successor to Nicholas II).

In the report Bakov emphasized that Karl Emich has been being an entrepreneur for long time, but from now on, all non-Throne related activity is disabled for him. The report contained a "Manifesto of granting the Constitution to the State", signed by Nicholas III, proclaiming the formation of the sovereign state "Imperial See" aimed at consolidating all the people around the world devoted to Christian Monarchism. The See in the documents is viewed as legacy to the first-ever Christian Roman Imperial Throne of Constantine the Great passed through Byzantine Empire to Russian Empire and House of Romanov via religious procedures.

Montenegro, Macedonia, Albania, Antigua and Barbuda, Gambia, Kiribati

Later Bakov announced he has purchased a plot of land in Montenegro to form a location for the new state (80 ha, "twice as big as Vatican"), and claimed to be in negotiations with Montenegro authorities on state's recognition. He has also informed that Russian President Vladimir Putin refused to grant such a plot in Yekaterinburg (Bakov's residence and place of 1918 Romanov assassination) in response to Karl Emich's request passed to Putin by Bakov, a former MP. In early 2015, as a follow-up to the International sanctions during the Ukrainian crisis, Bakov told the press there were talks with Montenegro authorities to establish an offshore zone at this plot, aimed at providing financial intermediation to Russian companies. Also in early 2015 Imperial Throne representatives claimed to be in talks with the authorities of the neighboring Republic of Macedonia and Albania on possible collaboration and future state recognition. In particular, Bakov held meeting with Macedonian Prime Minister Nikola Gruevski. Later there were the alike talks with President of the Gambia Yahya Jammeh at the 70th UN General Assembly session in USA (The Wall Street Journal later reported there are plans to continue Gambian talks after Jammeh was replaced by new president). Also, talks were held with Macedonian and Montenegro Eastern Orthodox clergy — Bakov discussed creation of churches associated with Imperial Throne and proposes canonization of Russian ancient ruler Ivan III and his wife Sophia Palaiologina, of Macedonian origin, who played significant roles in bringing Christian monarchy to Russia. Talks with Gaston Browne, Prime Minister of Antigua and Barbuda, also took place.

In the end of 2015, Nicholas III, commemorating Bakov's fiftieth birthday, granted Bakov the inheritable title of "His Serene Highness Prince" and presented him a Romanov family Eastern Orthodox icon depicting Saint Catherine, who is considered the Heavenly Patron of Yekaterinburg. The most known historical bearer of the Serene Prince title was Alexander Danilovich Menshikov, the closest ally of Peter the Great.

In May 2016 talks were held with government of Kiribati to invest US$350 million into development of tourism on three uninhabited islands: Malden Island, Caroline Island and Starbuck Island, aiming to build a "Romanov Empire" micronation there with the capital on the Malden Island. According to Bakov, "a great number of Russian patriots who are not happy with Putin's regime" are expected to arrive when the initial constructions are completed. In February 2017, Radio New Zealand announced that the Kiribati government had rejected the offer. Bakov later claimed it wasn't the final decision and that it was related to an inner Kiribati political struggle.

Bakov has been in the alike talks with Gambia since 2012. In December 2017 he announced that the proposed declaration of partnership was finally signed and new Gambia authorities, headed by Adama Barrow, had recognised the Romanov Empire. Bakov's land development companies now plan to create artificial islands in vicinity of Gambia capital Banjul to establish territory for the Empire. The 6-year design works and talks took $6 million, and after recognition documents would be ratified, Gambian budget would receive $60 million. At a press conference, Bakov also said he was in talks on recognition with 5 other undisclosed countries. Furthermore, Bakov had also proposed Russian Olympic athletes, who were recently denied attendance to 2018 Winter Olympics, to compete under Romanov Empire flag.

Arca Noë
In 2019 Bakov published a book called "The state is You!" where disclosed in details how his talks with the abovementioned governments went on. He reported that he initially was always met with enthusiasm, the officials gladly took money from him and promised support but later were all giving up. He suggests there was some hidden resist against him on unknown grounds. According to book, the 7-years Gambia campaign included plain fraud towards him in the course of regime change and concurrent chaos in one of the poorest Africa's nations while initially he was allowed by Yahya Jammeh to make measurements of oceanic bottom for future artificial islands and the whole engineering draft was completed (headed by his sons who have engineering education). He emphasized that many people who talked to him about devotion to Christian Monarchy and God were actually interested only in money. So that, he decided to relocate artificial islands into neutral Mediterranean waters near Venice and call the new project Arca Noë (likeness of Noah's Ark), joining the movement of seasteading. Citizens of Romanov Empire will be converted into new project members. He is going to start off after coronavirus pandemic restrictions for travels are cancelled.

Yekaterinburg Senate

The Yekaterinburg Senate is an independent civil governing body organized by Bakov aimed to provide social control for official Yekaterinburg authorities such as City Duma (Council). It was created shortly after 2013 elections. So far, 6 sessions were held where several infrastructure and social projects were presented, some included direct interaction with officials. Up to 100 volunteer "senators" are active at the sessions, such as Kirill Formanchuk. Bakov announces the scheme of a parliament with this Senate is supposed to be implemented in Romanov Empire when it's physically constructed. The Empire's supposed parliament is compared to resemble usual two-house parliament "turned upside-down" and based on demarchy.

Books and science
Anton Bakov is the author of the books: 
The Christian History of the Urals (1991)
Civilizations of the Middle-earth (1995) 
Which Russia do I Serve (1999) 
Idols of Power: from Cheops to Putin (2013) 
2014 Golden bull: Monarchist plan for Russian Renaissance (2014)
Democracy Russian style: Notes of the former USSR citizen (2016, expected to be translated into English).
 The state is You! (2019)
 Uralic ancestors of the Bakovs, the Serene Highness Princes (2021)
 Triumph and collapse of Bryuzgins, the Kozelsk's textile kings (2022)

In 2020 Bakov organized the creation of an illustrated book of fictional fairytales about a real 17th-century peasant Bogdashko Toporok, who turned out to be an ancestor of Bakov and many other modern people from Urals. Bakov discovered his identity while examining old Russian archives, but due to very little amount of documented information set the book up as a series of fictional stories exposing his own non-traditional view on those ages of Russian history. The author of the book is journalist and historian Alexander Kirillov, the illustrations are by Maksim Smagin, known for works for "Krasnaya Burda" magazine. Latter books of 2021 and 2022 are dedicated to detailed research of biographies of his documented ancestors (all he could find in all possible archives).

Bakov holds a PhD and 20 patents.

References

1965 births
20th-century Russian politicians
21st-century Russian politicians
Living people
Fourth convocation members of the State Duma (Russian Federation)
Micronational leaders
Russian activists against the 2022 Russian invasion of Ukraine
Russian monarchists
Soviet dissidents